Browns Spring is an unincorporated community in Stone County, in the U.S. state of Missouri. It is about 7 miles south of Clever and is about 3 miles west of Union City.

History
A post office called Browns Spring was established in 1912, and remained in operation until 1939. The community has the name of a spring near the original town site, which in turn was named after Burton Brown, a pioneer citizen. A variant name is "Brown Springs".

References

Unincorporated communities in Stone County, Missouri
Unincorporated communities in Missouri